Batman: The Doom That Came to Gotham is a three-issue comic book miniseries published from November 2000 to January 2001 under DC Comics' Elseworlds imprint. Written by Mike Mignola and Richard Pace and illustrated by Troy Nixey (pencils) and Dennis Janke (inks), with Mignola providing covers, the story deals with an alternate Batman in the 1920s fighting against mystical and supernatural forces that are taking Gotham by storm after he accidentally reawakens the being known as the Lurker on the Threshold. 

Mignola's third work for the character, the story is full of many Lovecraft-inspired renditions of both the Dark Knight's friends and foes, including Green Arrow, Two-Face, Ra's al Ghul, and so on. In addition, the story's title is an allusion to Lovecraft's "The Doom That Came to Sarnath". In 2015, the story was finally collected into one full volume by DC and published as a trade paperback.

Plot

In other media
An animated film based on the books was announced at San Diego Comic-Con on July 22, 2022.  The film will be released on 4K Blu-ray, Blu-ray and Digital on March 28, 2023.

The cast list is as follows: 

David Giuntoli as Bruce Wayne / Batman
Tati Gabrielle as Kai Li Cain
Christopher Gorham as Oliver Queen / Green Arrow
John DiMaggio as James Gordon
Patrick Fabian as Harvey Dent / Two-Face
Brian George as Alfred
Jason Marsden as both Dick Grayson / Young Bruce Wayne
Karan Brar as Sanjay “Jay” Tawde
David Dastmalchian as Grendon
Navid Negahban as Ra’s al Ghul
Emily O'Brien as Talia al Ghul and Martha Wayne
Tim Russ as Lucius Fox
Matthew Waterson as Jason Blood / Etrigan
Jeffrey Combs as Kirk Langstrom
William Salyers as Oswald Cobblepot / The Penguin, Professor Manfurd
Gideon Adlon as Barbara Gordon / Oracle, Poison Ivy / Pamela Isley 
Darin De Paul as Thomas Wayne

References

 

Batman titles
Elseworlds titles
DC Comics adapted into films
DC Comics limited series
2000 comics debuts
Cthulhu Mythos comics
Mythology in DC Comics